Setascutum is a genus of cave wētā in the family Rhaphidophoridae, endemic to New Zealand.

Species 
 Setascutum ohauense Richards, 1972 
 Setascutum pallidum Richards, 1972

References 

 Peripatus

Ensifera genera
Cave weta